The 1975 NCAA Division I Tennis Championships were the 30th annual tournaments to determine the national champions of NCAA Division I men's singles, doubles, and team collegiate tennis in the United States. 

UCLA captured the team championship, the Bruins' eleventh such title. UCLA finished seven points ahead of Miami (FL) in the final team standings (27–20).

Host site
This year's tournaments were hosted by University of Texas–Pan American (now known as University of Texas–Rio Grande Valley) and contested at the HEB Tennis Center in Corpus Christi, Texas.

Team scoring
Until 1977, the men's team championship was determined by points awarded based on individual performances in the singles and doubles events.

References

External links
List of NCAA Men's Tennis Champions

NCAA Division I tennis championships
NCAA Division I Tennis Championships
NCAA Division I Tennis Championships
NCAA Division I Tennis Championships